The Olympus OM-10 is a 35mm single-lens reflex camera model that was launched by Olympus Corporation in June 1979. It is a part of the Olympus OM system.

Specifications
 Model: SLR camera automatic exposure control electronic shutter type 35mm focal-plane
 Size: 136 x 83 x 50 mm
 Screen size: 24 x 36 mm
 Weight: 430g (15.17 oz)
 Sensitivity range: ISO25-ISO1600
 Mount: Olympus OM mount
 Winding film: lever
 Rewind film formula: crank
 Shutter: Electronically controlled focal-plane
 Shutter speed: B, 1-1/1000 seconds

External links

 Olympus History : OM Series Olympus Corporation History Page.
 Film Advance: Olympus OM-10 
  Olympus OM-10 Instructions

OM-10